"Puppet on a String" (sub-titled "Let Her Go") is a pop song written by Joe Camilleri, Jeff Burstin and Tony Faehse and recorded by Australian blues, rock and R&B band Jo Jo Zep & The Falcons. The song was released in July 1980 as the second single from the band's fifth studio album Hats Off Step Lively (1980).

The song peaked at number 53 on the Kent Music Report in Australia.

Track listing 
7" (K 7993) 
Side A "Puppet on a String" - 3:20
Side B "Ain't Going to Spend Another Lonely Night Without You" - 3:16

Charts

References 

1980 songs
1980 singles
Mushroom Records singles
Songs written by Joe Camilleri
Jo Jo Zep & The Falcons songs